Larry Owens is an American comedian, actor, writer, and singer. He received a Lucille Lortel Award and a Drama Desk Award for his leading performance in the off-Broadway musical A Strange Loop. Owens has acted on television shows including Search Party, High Maintenance, Modern Love, and Abbott Elementary.

Early life and education 
Owens was born and raised in East Baltimore, Maryland. He named Hairspray as a musical he saw growing up that helped him see musical theater as a career path. He loved the work of Stephen Sondheim and nurtured his interest at the performing arts camp Stagedoor Manor.

He trained in acting and improvisational theater at the School at Steppenwolf and named Tarell Alvin McCraney, Amy Morton, and K. Todd Freeman as some of his instructors.

Owens moved to New York in 2015 to pursue a professional career in the performance arts. He was a volunteer at the Musical Theatre Factory and there connected with playwright Michael R. Jackson, who wrote A Strange Loop.

Career

Theatre 
Owens performed in the musical theater productions Spamilton and Gigantic. He also performed for Catherine Cohen's Cabernet Cabaret and hosted his own monthly show Decolonize Your Mind with Karen Chee.

In 2019 he gained wider prominence and received critical acclaim for his performance in Michael R. Jackson's A Strange Loop, performed off-Broadway at Playwrights Horizons and directed by Stephen Brackett. Vinson Cunningham praised his performance in The New Yorker: "Owens...performs Jackson’s songs with power, humor, and pathos, filling in the textual gaps in Usher’s characterization with an entire life’s worth of mannerism and style." For his performance he won a Lucille Lortel Award and a Drama Desk Award for Outstanding Actor in a Musical, among other accolades.

In July 2021 he starred in the original solo show Sondheimia, performed at Feinstein's/54 Below.

Television 
Owens was a staff writer for the truTV game show Paid Off. He acted on season four of High Maintenance as well as the television shows Search Party, Abbott Elementary, Dash & Lily, Life & Beth, and Modern Love. He is a voice actor in the Amazon animated series Fairfax.

Personal life 
Owens is queer.

Filmography

Stage

Television

Film

Awards and nominations

For A Strange Loop

2019 
 Nominee, Antonyo Award for Best Actor in a Musical Off-Broadway

2020 
 Nominee, Drama League, Distinguished Performance Award
 Winner, Outer Critics Circle Award for Outstanding Actor in a Musical
 Winner, Lucille Lortel Award for Outstanding Lead Actor in a Musical
 Winner, Drama Desk Award for Outstanding Actor in a Musical
Honoree, Obie Award, Special Citation to the Creative Team and Ensemble

References

External links 
 Official Instagram
 

Year of birth missing (living people)
Living people
African-American actors
African-American singers
American LGBT entertainers
American LGBT actors
American LGBT singers
American LGBT writers
Writers from Baltimore
Comedians from Maryland
LGBT African Americans
American male musical theatre actors
LGBT people from Maryland
American television actors
Gay entertainers
Queer actors
Drama Desk Award winners